Bithynia funiculata is a species of freshwater snail with a gill and an operculum, an aquatic gastropod mollusk in the family Bithyniidae.

Taxonomy 
Previously (for example WHO 1995) considered this taxon to be a subspecies of Bithynia siamensis, however, Bithynia funiculata is treated as a separate species in the 2012 IUCN Red List.

Distribution 
Distribution of this species includes:
 Thailand

Ecology 
Bithynia funiculata is an intermediate host for:
 The cat liver fluke Opisthorchis tenuicollis
 This species transfers echinostomiasis.
 Some references also mention also the trematode Opisthorchis viverrini as a first intermediate host.

References

External links 

Bithyniidae
Gastropods described in 1927